The National Celebrities Open and the National Capital Open were the names of golf tournaments on the PGA Tour that were played in the greater Washington, D.C. area in the middle part of the 20th century.

Winners

References

Former PGA Tour events
Golf in Maryland